Democratic Revolution is a Chilean left-wing political party, founded in 2012 by some of the leaders of the 2011 Chilean student protests, most notably the current Deputy Giorgio Jackson, who is also the most popular public figure of the party. Their principles are based on advocating for participative democracy and the overcoming of neoliberalism in Chile.

History 

The movement was founded on January 7, 2012, adding up to more than 4000 supporters in the first week.

They presented three candidates for the 2013 Chilean parliamentary election, winning one seat in the Chamber of Deputies, the former student leader Giorgio Jackson. They did not support any of the presidential candidates, although the majority of the movement decided to request the vote for Michelle Bachelet in the second round of the election. The same year, the movement elected their first Executive Committee, led by Miguel Crispi and Sebastián Depolo.

In mid-2015, the members of the movement decided to start the process to become a party. After collecting signatures all over the country, they were accepted as an official party in 2016. Being an official party, they presented candidates for the Municipal election of 2016, most notably candidates for mayor in Antofagasta, La Serena, Taltal, among other towns, electing 9 members of Municipal Councils.

Since 2018, the party has 7 deputies in the Chilean parliament and a senator.

Presidential candidates 
The following is a list of the presidential candidates supported by Democratic Revolution.
2017: Beatriz Sánchez (lost)
2021: Gabriel Boric (won)

References

External links
Democratic Revolution 

2012 establishments in Chile
Foro de São Paulo
Left-wing politics in Chile
Political parties established in 2012
Political parties in Chile
Socialist parties in Chile